The 52nd New Zealand Parliament was a meeting of the legislature in New Zealand, which opened on 7 November 2017 following the 2017 general election and dissolved on 6 September 2020. The New Zealand Parliament comprises the Sovereign (represented by the governor-general) and the House of Representatives, which consists of 120 members.

The 52nd Parliament was elected using a mixed-member proportional representation (MMP) voting system. Members of Parliament (MPs) represent 71 geographical electorates: 16 in the South Island, 48 in the North Island and 7 Māori electorates. The remaining members were elected from party lists using the Sainte-Laguë method to achieve proportionality. The number of geographical electorates was increased by one at the 2014 election, to account for the North Island's higher population growth.

Background

2017 general election

The 2017 general election was held on Saturday, 23 September 2017. Voters elected 120 members to the House of Representatives, with 71 electorate members and 49 list members. Official results indicated that the National Party had won a plurality, winning 56 seats; down from 60 in 2014. The Labour Party won 46 seats, up from 32 at the last election. Their partner, the Green Party won 8 seats, down from 14. New Zealand First won 9 seats, down from 11. ACT won the electorate of Epsom, and enough party votes to avoid an overhang, but failed to win any more party votes to entitle it to more seats.

Formation 
Since neither the National–ACT or Labour–Green blocs managed to reach the necessary majority to form a government, New Zealand First was left in the position of kingmaker. Negotiations between New Zealand First and each of National and Labour continued over the next four weeks. On 19 October, Winston Peters announced he was forming a coalition agreement with Labour, with the Greens in a confidence-and-supply agreement. The Greens' support, plus the coalition, resulting in 63 seats to National's 56 – enough to ensure that Ardern maintained the confidence of the House. On 26 October 2017, Jacinda Ardern was sworn in as prime minister by Governor-General Dame Patsy Reddy.

Parliamentary term 

Jacinda Ardern, as Leader of the Labour Party, serves as Prime Minister. Winston Peters, as Leader of New Zealand First, serves as Deputy Prime Minister and Minister of Foreign Affairs. Prime Minister Ardern appointed Grant Robertson as Minister of Finance, Ron Mark as Minister of Defence, Kelvin Davis as Minister of Corrections, David Parker as Attorney General, Andrew Little as Minister of Justice, Dr David Clark as Minister of Health, and Chris Hipkins as Minister of Education and Leader of the House.

For a period of six weeks beginning 21 June 2018, Winston Peters served as Acting Prime Minister of New Zealand, while Prime Minister Jacinda Ardern took maternity leave. Ardern was only the second head of government to give birth while in office, after Benazir Bhutto, who gave birth while serving as Prime Minister of Pakistan.

Major events

 12 October 2017 — The writ for election is returned; officially declaring all elected members of the 52nd Parliament.
 19 October 2017 — A coalition government between Labour and NZ First is confirmed, with C&S from the Green Party.
 25 October 2017 — Chris Hipkins is confirmed Leader of the House.
 26 October 2017 — Jacinda Ardern is sworn in as Prime Minister of New Zealand.
 7 November 2017 — The Governor-General issued the Commission of Opening of Parliament. The House elected Trevor Mallard as Speaker.
 8 November 2017 — State Opening of Parliament.
 13 February 2018 — Bill English announced he would resign as Leader of the National Party and Leader of the Opposition on 27 February, before retiring from Parliament on 1 March, thus resigning as Father of the House.
 27 February 2018 — Simon Bridges is elected as National Party leader, succeeding Bill English as Party Leader and Leader of the Opposition
 27 February 2018 — Fletcher Tabuteau replaces Ron Mark as Deputy Leader of New Zealand First
 22 March 2018 — Jonathan Coleman, MP for Northcote, resigns from Parliament, triggering a by-election in Northcote.
 8 April 2018 — Marama Davidson is elected the female co-leader of the Green Party.
 17 May 2018 — The 2018 budget is presented to Parliament.
 21 June 2018 — Prime Minister Jacinda Ardern takes maternity leave following giving birth to a baby girl. Winston Peters becomes acting Prime Minister.
 2 August 2018 — Jacinda Ardern returns as Prime Minister after six weeks of maternity leave.
 7 September 2018 — Labour MP Clare Curran resigns from all of her ministerial portfolios.
 20 September 2018 — Labour MP Meka Whaitiri is removed as a minister following an investigation of an alleged assault in her office.
 30 May 2019 — The 2019 budget, also named the Wellbeing Budget, is presented to Parliament.
 14 May 2020 — The 2020 budget, also named Rebuilding Together is presented to Parliament.
 22 May 2020 — Todd Muller is elected as National Party leader, defeating Simon Bridges and succeeding him as Party Leader and Leader of the Opposition. Nikki Kaye defeats Paula Bennett for the role of deputy leader.
 14 July 2020 — Todd Muller resigns and Judith Collins is elected as leader of the National Party. Gerry Brownlee becomes deputy leader of the National Party.
 21 July 2020 — Andrew Falloon, MP for Rangitata, resigns from Parliament following revelations he sent unsolicited sexually explicit text messages to young women.
 22 July 2020 — Iain Lees-Galloway, MP for Palmerston North, is removed as a minister following revelations he had an inappropriate relationship with a staffer.
 6 August 2020 – The last intended sitting is held, concluding with the adjournment debate.
 12 August 2020 – The dissolution of Parliament is delayed after new community-spread cases of COVID-19 were reported in Auckland the previous day.
 18 August 2020 – The House resumes limited sittings following the delayed dissolution.
 2 September 2020 – The last sitting day of the Parliament.
 6 September 2020 – The Parliament is dissolved.

Major legislation 
On 31 October 2017, Prime Minister Jacinda Ardern announced that for their first bill, the government would amend the Overseas Investment Act 2005 to categorise existing residential properties as "sensitive", restricting its sale to citizens and permanent residents only. The Overseas Investment Amendment Act 2018 was introduced on 14 December 2017 and received royal assent on 22 August 2018.

On 8 November 2017, the Parental Leave and Employment Protection Amendment Bill was introduced and received royal assent on 4 December 2017. It extends paid parental leave to 22 weeks starting from 1 July 2018 and 26 weeks from 1 July 2020.

On 4 December 2017, royal assent was given to the Healthy Homes Guarantee Bill, which was introduced on 15 October 2015 during the previous Parliament. It ensures every rental house in the country meets standards of heating and insulation.

On 22 December 2017, the Misuse of Drugs (Medicinal Cannabis) Amendment Bill was introduced, receiving royal assent on 17 December 2018. The act amends the Misuse of Drugs Act 1975 to allow terminally ill patients to use cannabis, provide a regulatory body to set standards for cannabis products, and declassify cannabidiol as a controlled substance.

On 11 April 2019, royal assent was given to the Arms (Prohibited Firearms, Magazines, and Parts) Amendment Act 2019. It amended the Arms Act 1983 to ban semi-automatic firearms, magazines, and parts that can be used to assemble prohibited firearms.

On 8 May 2019, the Climate Change Response (Zero Carbon) Amendment Bill was introduced, receiving royal assent on 13 November 2019. It provides a framework for developing climate change policies in support of the Paris Agreement.

On 23 March 2020, the Abortion Legislation Act received royal assent, decriminalising abortion. Under the act, women can seek an abortion without restrictions within the first 20 weeks of their pregnancy.

On 12 May 2020, the COVID-19 Public Health Response Bill was introduced and speedily passed, receiving royal assent the day after. The bill establishes standalone legislation that provides a legal framework for responding to the COVID-19 pandemic in New Zealand for a period of up to 2 years.

Dissolution 

Under section 17 of the Constitution Act 1986, Parliament must dissolve a maximum of "3 years from the day fixed for the return of the writs issued for the last preceding general election of members of the House of Representatives, and no longer." The writ for the 2017 election was issued on 23 August 2017 and returned on 12 October 2017, meaning that the 52nd Parliament would have to dissolve on or before 12 October 2020.

This Parliament had its last scheduled sitting on 6 August 2020 and was originally set to be dissolved on 12 August. However, the dissolution of Parliament was delayed to 17 August after four cases of COVID-19 outside of a quarantine facility were reported in Auckland leading to an increase in the region's alert level, and was later delayed further to 6 September. Parliament resumed sitting on 18 August for a further three weeks. The business of the House in this period was limited, sitting only two days a week, for no more than two hours at a time, and for the sole purpose of scrutinising the government's response to COVID-19, with no further legislation progressed. The last sitting of the additional period was held on 2 September, and the Parliament was dissolved as scheduled on 6 September.

Officeholders

Speaker
 Speaker of the House: Rt. Hon. Trevor Mallard (Labour)
 Deputy Speaker of the House: Hon. Anne Tolley (National)
 Assistant Speaker of the House: Hon. Ruth Dyson (Labour) (from 3 July 2019)
 Poto Williams (Labour) (until 3 July 2019)
 Assistant Speaker of the House: Adrian Rurawhe (Labour)

Other parliamentary officers
The following is a list of other parliamentary officers who are non-political:
 Clerk: David Wilson
 Deputy Clerk: Suze Jones
 Serjeant-at-Arms: Steve Streefkerk

Party leaders
 Prime Minister of New Zealand: Rt. Hon. Jacinda Ardern (Labour)
 Deputy Leader of the Labour Party: Hon. Kelvin Davis
 Deputy Prime Minister of New Zealand: Rt. Hon. Winston Peters (New Zealand First)
 Deputy Leader of New Zealand First:
 Hon. Ron Mark (until 27 February 2018)
 Fletcher Tabuteau (from 27 February 2018)
 Leader of the Opposition (National):
 Rt. Hon. Bill English (until 27 February 2018)
 Hon. Simon Bridges (from 27 February 2018 to 22 May 2020)
 Todd Muller (from 22 May 2020 to 14 July 2020)
 Hon. Judith Collins (since 14 July 2020)
 Deputy Leader of the Opposition (National):
 Hon. Paula Bennett (until 22 May 2020)
 Hon. Nikki Kaye (from 22 May 2020 to 14 July 2020)
 Hon. Gerry Brownlee (from 14 July 2020)
 Co-leaders of the Green Party of Aotearoa New Zealand:
 Male Co-leader: Hon. James Shaw
 Female Co-leader: Marama Davidson (from 8 April 2018)
 Leader of ACT New Zealand: David Seymour

Floor leaders
 Leader of the House: Hon. Chris Hipkins
 Deputy Leader of the House: Hon. Iain Lees-Galloway until 21 July 2020
 Shadow Leader of the House:
 Hon. Simon Bridges until 27 February 2018
 Hon. Gerry Brownlee from 11 March 2018 to 16 July 2020
 Chris Bishop from 16 July 2020

Whips
 Senior Government Whip:
 Michael Wood from 27 June 2019
 Hon. Ruth Dyson until 27 June 2019
 Junior Labour Whip: Kieran McAnulty
 Assistant Labour Whip: Kiri Allan
 Senior Opposition Whip:
 Barbara Kuriger from 11 March 2018
 Jami-Lee Ross until 11 March 2018
 Junior Opposition Whip:
 Matt Doocey from 11 March 2018
 Barbara Kuriger until 11 March 2018
 Third Opposition Whip:
 Tim van de Molen from 11 March 2018
 Matt Doocey until 11 March 2018
 New Zealand First Whip: Clayton Mitchell
 Green Party Musterer:
 Chlöe Swarbrick from 18 November 2019
 Gareth Hughes until 18 November 2019
 Green Party Deputy Musterer:
 Chlöe Swarbrick from 6 May 2018 until 18 November 2019
 Marama Davidson until 8 April 2018

Shadow Cabinets
 Opposition Cabinet of Judith Collins during the 52nd Parliament from 14 July 2020
 Opposition Cabinet of Todd Muller during the 52nd Parliament from 22 May 2020 until 14 July 2020
 Opposition Cabinet of Simon Bridges during the 52nd Parliament from 11 March 2018 until 22 May 2020
Opposition Cabinet of Bill English during the 52nd Parliament until 27 February 2018

Members
The table below show the members of the 52nd Parliament based on the official results of the 2017 general election. Ministerial roles were officially announced on 25 October 2017.

Overview
This table shows the number of MPs in each party:

Notes
 New Zealand First announced a coalition agreement with the Labour Party on 19 October 2017.
 The Green Party entered into confidence-and-supply agreement with the Labour Party on the same day as the coalition was announced.
The Working Government majority is calculated as all Government MPs less all other parties.

Members

Changes 
The following changes in Members of Parliament occurred during the term of the 52nd Parliament:

Seating plan 
The chamber is in a horseshoe-shape.

Start of term

End of term

Committees

The 52nd Parliament has 12 select committees and 7 specialist committees. They are listed below, with their chairpersons and deputy chairpersons:

Electorates

This section shows New Zealand electorates as they were represented at the end of the 52nd Parliament.

General electorates

Māori electorates

See also

Opinion polling for the 2017 New Zealand general election
Politics of New Zealand
New Zealand House of Representatives committees

References

New Zealand parliaments
2017 elections in New Zealand
Lists of political office-holders in New Zealand
November 2017 events in New Zealand
September 2020 events in New Zealand